USS Wisconsin (SSBN-827) is a future United States Navy ballistic missile submarine. This will be the second .

Naming and construction
On October 28, 2020, it was announced by Secretary of the Navy Kenneth J. Braithwaite that the second named Columbia-class submarine would bear the name Wisconsin. This came from a bipartisan push from U.S. Senators Tammy Baldwin and Ron Johnson. Both senators cited Wisconsin's history of shipbuilding as a reason to name a new submarine after the state. Construction on Wisconsin is scheduled to be procured in FY2024. The Columbia-class submarines are set to replace the  ballistic missile submarine. The lead boat  officially began construction on October 1, 2020 and is scheduled to enter service in 2031.

References

Columbia-class submarines
Ballistic missile submarines